Muhammad Nurullah bin Mohamed Hussein  (born May 8, 1993) is a Singaporean footballer formerly played as a defender for Geylang International FC in Singapore Premier League.

Honours

Club
Balestier Khalsa
 Singapore Cup (1) : 2014

References

External links
 

Living people
1993 births
Singaporean footballers
Association football defenders
Gombak United FC players
Young Lions FC players
Balestier Khalsa FC players
Singapore Premier League players